"Unforgiven" is a 2001 single, released by the all-female pop rock/new wave band The Go-Go's. The song was the first single from their fourth studio album God Bless the Go-Go's. The song, written by Charlotte Caffey, Green Day lead singer Billie Joe Armstrong, and Jane Wiedlin, this was the first new song released by the group since 1994's "The Whole World Lost Its Head".

Chart positions

2001 singles
The Go-Go's songs
Songs written by Charlotte Caffey
Songs written by Jane Wiedlin
Songs written by Billie Joe Armstrong
2000 songs